Ganesh is a surname. Notable people with the surname include:
Amresh Ganesh (1988), Indian actor, film composer and singer, who has worked in Tamil language films
Babu Ganesh, Indian film actor-director, who has worked in Tamil films
Bandla Ganesh (1973), Indian actor, and film producer of Telugu cinema
Delhi Ganesh (1944), Indian actor who mostly acts in supporting roles in Tamil cinema
Dodda Ganesh (1973), former Indian cricketer
Ishari K. Ganesh (1966), Indian academic
J. N. Ganesh), Indian politician
Jai Ganesh (1946–2001), Indian Tamil film actor
Janan Ganesh (1982), British journalist, author and political commentator
Kudroli Ganesh, Indian magician
M. P. Ganesh) (born 1946), former Indian field hockey player
Meena Ganesh, Indian actress who acts mostly in Malayalam movies
R. Ganesh (politician), Indian politician
Savitri Ganesh (1935–1981), Indian actress, playback singer, dancer, director, and producer
Senthil Ganesh (1983), Indian folk, playback singer and actor 
Shatavadhani Ganesh (1962), Indian practitioner of the art of avadhana, a polyglot, an author in Sanskrit

Hindustani-language surnames
Surnames of Hindustani origin